Grand Chief Stewart Phillip is an Okanagan Aboriginal leader who has served as President of the Union of BC Indian Chiefs since 1998. As Chief of the Penticton Indian Band in British Columbia from 1994 until 2008, as well as Chair of the Okanagan Nation Alliance, he has advocated for Aboriginal rights for the First Nations in that province and particularly in the Okanagan region. He was awarded the title Grand Chief by the Okanagan Nation in 2006 in honour of his lifetime of commitment to and work for Indigenous rights and title.

Activism 
In 2002, Phillip drew media attention when he successfully forced a film project about the Aboriginal legend of the Ogopogo to be renamed Mee-Shee: The Water Giant.  He did this by claiming that "It's an international concern among indigenous people about the exploitation of spiritual entities... for commercial purposes."

On November 26, 2014, Phillip told delegates at the B.C. Federation of Labour convention that he would get arrested as a matter of principle to protest Kinder Morgan’s plans to expand the Trans Mountain pipeline. The following day Phillip joined protesters at a Kinder Morgan borehole site on Burnaby Mountain,  "We are making a very clear public statement that we do not support the Harper and Clark governments when it comes to resources," he said before his arrest. He has been arrested 4 other times while fighting for Indigenous rights.

Awards 
In 2017, Grand Chief Stewart Phillip and his wife, Joan Phillip, were awarded the Eugene Rogers Environmental Award by the Wilderness Committee "for their decades of commitment to preserving and protecting lands, waters and the environment for future generations." In November 2018, Phillip will receive an honorary Doctor of Laws from the University of British Columbia.

Family 
Phillip is married to Joan Phillip, who he describes as having "it all. Courage, principles, integrity, hard-working and dedicated." He also has 6 children, 15 grandchildren, and loves fishing, camping, and hunting.

References

Year of birth missing (living people)
Living people
Indigenous leaders in British Columbia
People from Penticton
Activists from British Columbia
Indigenous rights activists